Ozine Fest is an annual anime convention organized by the editorial committee of Otakuzine Anime Magazine, a local anime magazine published in the Philippines by PSICOM Publishing, Inc. (Now as merged and jointly owned by Viva Entertainment as Viva PSICOM Publishing Corporation). The event features mainstream activities such as cosplay competition, exhibition booths, band tournament, Japanese karaoke contests and art contests.

History 

Ozine Fest was first held at Robinsons Galleria on December 16, 2005, where 3,752 tickets were reportedly sold. It followed a year later and was held at the Le Pavillon, Metropolitan Park on July 30, 2006.

On April 1, 2007, the third Ozine Fest was held at a new venue, the Megatrade Hall of SM Megamall in Mandaluyong. The Megatrade Hall became the official venue of Ozine Fest from 2007 up to 2016

References

External links
Ozine Fest Official Website
Otakuzine Anime Magazine Official Website

Anime conventions in the Philippines
Mandaluyong
Events in Metro Manila
Recurring events established in 2005
Annual events in the Philippines
2005 establishments in the Philippines